Shilo Norman is a fictional character, a superhero in the DC Comics universe. He is the third person to use the name Mister Miracle. Created by Jack Kirby, he first appeared in Mister Miracle #15 (August 1973).

Fictional character biography

Biography
Shilo's mother abandoned him as an infant. He spent the early parts of his youth in an orphanage in the Suicide Slum in Metropolis. Shilo was unsatisfied with his lot in life, so he fled the abuses of the orphanage and began living on the streets.

Young Shilo Norman became the informal ward of escapologist Thaddeus Brown (Mister Miracle I), and also served as an occasional stand-in. When Thaddeus Brown was murdered by a mobster named Steel Hand, his protege Scott Free avenged his new friend's death by taking on the identity of Mister Miracle and bringing Steel Hand to justice.  After Brown's death, Shilo worked with the new Mister Miracle and his wife Barda.

Shilo was eventually reunited with his brother, only to watch him be murdered by a gang member. He ran to the police, and Metropolis policeman Solomon Driver (Mister Miracle #15) was assigned to leave Shilo Norman in the protective custody of Scott Free. Driver's relationship with Scott was cordial; he didn't take Mister Miracle's crimefighting career very seriously, and believed that "escape artists could give us police a lot of trouble".

Shilo escaped to take revenge for his brother's death on his own, but Scott and Barda followed, preventing him from making a terrible mistake. During the course of these events, Shilo saved Scott’s life. Scott decided to train Shilo in his own special escape artistry techniques and gave him advanced New Genesis technology.

Still a master escape artist, the now-adult Shilo was appointed security chief of the Slabside Island Maximum Security prison for Metahumans, also known as the Slab. For his heroic actions during the Joker's "Last Laugh" riot, he was promoted to Warden of the Slab, which had by then been relocated to Antarctica.

Celebrity

Shilo appeared as a successful and well-paid escape artist, using the name Mister Miracle. He became famous for large scale televised stunts, including well-publicized escapes from the second dimension, the center of the earth, and inside the event horizon of a miniature black hole. These stunts enabled him to live a lavish celebrity lifestyle. Within the black hole, Shilo had a vision of a familiar but different life, spanning years. In his vision, he still possessed a Mother Box, but had no memory of the New Gods. Shilo saw all his friends fall to the Anti-Life Equation, after which Darkseid subjected him to the "Omega Sanction" in which he lived a series of oppressive lives (including one in which he was working at the Slab). Upon escaping from this trap, Shilo found himself in the black hole where he first met Metron, seven days later.

In Seven Soldiers #1, Shilo heads to the Dark Side Club to free Aurakles, Earth's first superhero, in order to break the Sheeda's contract with Darkseid to "harrow" Earth and let him hunt down the Gods. In exchange, he sacrifices his life, and at the end of the issue his second resurrection is shown—escaping literally from the grave, apparently thanks to his absorption of Mother Box's consciousness and abilities.

Firestorm
Shilo appears in Firestorm, the Nuclear Man #33. He approaches Jason Rusch and Martin Stein, the two men who currently come together to form Firestorm. He informs them that one quarter of the Life Equation is hidden within the Firestorm Matrix while the other quarters are apparently held by Earth's other three Elementals, the Red Tornado, Naiad and Swamp Thing.

Final Crisis
In the second issue of Final Crisis, Shilo is seen talking to the Japanese metahuman Sonny Sumo, telling him of a "cosmic war", that "the powers of evil won", and that Motherboxxx is "the only thing left". He asks for the hero's help in recruiting a team. He leads a team of rookie Japanese heroes in a desperate bid against Darkseid's growing power on Earth, but he fails. In the same moment in which Darkseid is able to take fully over Dan Turpin's body and be reborn on Earth, a sniper shoots him in the chest, seemingly killing the Avatar of Freedom and bringing forth the Victory of Evil. It is later revealed that he survived due to a bulletproof vest; he speaks to Mister Terrific about defeating Darkseid, who is destroying the universe.

Brightest Day
During the events of Brightest Day, Alan Scott is driven insane by his Starheart power and creates a fortress on the moon with the intent of using it as a base while he begins his plan to destroy the world. After Miss Martian uses her powers to get a mental layout of a holding cell inside the fortress, it is made clear to the heroes that the fortress must contain Fourth World technology. Shilo appears at the end of Justice Society of America (vol. 3) #41, where he is recruited by the Justice League to help a small team composed of Batman,  Jade, Mr. America, Hourman, Donna Troy, and Jesse Quick infiltrate the fortress and get past its advanced defenses. As a nod to the events of Seven Soldiers, Shilo refers to himself as the "Seventh Soldier" of the group.

Shilo successfully leads the team about halfway through the fortress, only to be attacked by apparitions created by the Starheart. Jesse and Jade are able to pull Shilo away from the beasts before he is killed, but his wounds are severe enough that the Mother Box is forced to heal him. Donna Troy states that the Mother Box should be able to completely rejuvenate Shilo, but then goes on to say that the heroes have to leave him behind, as they cannot risk taking him with them while he is unconscious. Some time after the defeat of the Starheart, Shilo is shown aiding Superman and a number of other heroes in an attempt to penetrate a large energy dome that has materialized over the city of Washington, D.C.

Powers and abilities
Shilo Norman has no superhuman powers, but he's a superb athlete, with great acrobatic and gymnastic skills. In his youth, Shilo was trained by Thaddeus Brown in all techniques of the escape arts. Shilo Norman became a highly qualified escape artist and was later trained by Scott Free himself. Shilo discovered his passion for escaping early and tried a number of times to escape different scenarios even as a young child. Shilo shows his proficiency by becoming a world renowned known escape artist. 

Shilo also was trained by Scott Free and Big Barda in various fighting techniques and martial arts. Shilo has demonstrated to be a skilled fighter with amazing reflexes.

Later, as a student at New York University, Shilo studied a wide variety of subjects, and in his spare time he performed sleight of hand and small feats of street magic for the crowds in Washington Square Park. He developed an annoying habit of talking in non sequiturs, which he attributes to too many comparative philosophy classes. He was apparently studying for a degree in physics, and had taken several other modern science courses. He met and began to date Fiona Leeway. During this time, he experimented with the "hero gig" as a third generation Mister Miracle, standing in for Scott as a member of Justice League International using New Genesis technology that he had either modified or built himself, such as his Enerjams and Zoom Pads.

Equipment
Enerjams -  Shilo's most distinctive invention, enerjams are mounds of pure energy produced from his gloves which can emit heat and magnetic fields that help him grip onto walls.
Mother Box - None of Shilo's new devices would work without the symbiotic power of Mother Box, a living computer he received from Scott Free. Shilo adapted his Mother Box.
Multi-Cube - Shilo has his own version of Scott's multi-cube, a 1" square that acts as computer and communicator, emitting both regular and ultraviolet light, sonic vibrations, and holograms.
Sticky Boots - Shilo's boots contain "thermal inductors" and magnetic grips.
Uniform - Incorporated within the hood of his JLI era uniform were synapse-sensing devices that allowed much of the circuitry in his costume to react at the speed of thought. To track criminals, he carried tiny mini-transmitters with a morphogenetic gamma field detector equipped with an EM filter circuit to dampen electromagnetic interference.
Zoom Pads - A redesigned version of Mister Miracle's Aero-Discs.

References

External links
Oracle Files: Shilo Norman
Mister Miracle #15 - The Secret Gun
List of New Gods technology
DCU Guide Mister Miracle III
Index to the Earth-1 Fourth World stories

African-American superheroes
Characters created by Jack Kirby
Comics characters introduced in 1973
DC Comics male superheroes
DC Comics orphans
DC Comics martial artists
Fictional escapologists
Fourth World (comics)